The 1992 Georgia Southern Eagles football team represented the Georgia Southern Eagles of Georgia Southern University during the 1992 NCAA Division I-AA football season. The Eagles played their home games at Paulson Stadium in Statesboro, Georgia. The team was coached by Tim Stowers, in his third year as head coach for the Eagles. The Eagles were in a transition season from Independent to the Southern Conference during the 1992 season.

Schedule

References

Georgia Southern
Georgia Southern Eagles football seasons
Georgia Southern Eagles football